BKC may refer to:
 Beyoncé Knowles-Carter, an American entertainer and pop icon.
 Bandra-Kurla complex in Mumbai, India
 Berkman Klein Center for Internet & Society at Harvard University
 Benzalkonium chloride, a type of cationic surfactant
 BlitzkriegCommander, a tabletop wargame
 Buckland Airport (IATA: BKC), an airport in Alaska
 Burger King, whose NYSE stock symbol was formerly BKC

See also 
 ВКС (in cyrillic letters) : the Russian Aerospace Forces (Russian: Воздушно-космические силы)